Elizabeth Nannestad (born 1956 in Browns Bay, Auckland) is a New Zealand poet.

Life
She studied medicine at Otago University and has worked as a doctor and forensic psychiatrist. She lives and works in Auckland.

Her work has been published in Sport, Poetry New Zealand, Landfall and Islands.

Awards
 1987 New Zealand Book Award for Poetry with Allen Curnow

Works
"Immediately After", Seeing voices

Anthologies
 My Heart Goes Swimming: New Zealand Love Poems (1996)

References

External links
"Elizabeth Nannestad", New Zealand Electronic Poetry Centre

1956 births
Living people
New Zealand women poets
University of Otago alumni
20th-century New Zealand poets
20th-century New Zealand women writers